Gary Phillip Roberts  (born 31 March 1952) is an Australian radio personality and former managing director of Perth, Western Australia, radio station 96FM (call sign: 6NOW) having joined it 12 months after leaving the helm of rival Perth radio station Nova 93.7. He started his radio career in the late 1960s at 3AW in Melbourne. He spent nine years on air with a number of stations including 5AD in Adelaide, 2UW in Sydney and 6KY in Perth before moving into programming. As a program director, he programmed four stations to No 1 in their respective markets including a record run of 34 consecutive No 1 surveys with 96FM, which he launched in 1980. He was general manager of 96FM from 1984 to 1992 when he left to take over the same role at 94.5FM in Perth.

Roberts and his team quickly transformed 94.5FM (now MIX 94.5) from a poor No 5 to a strong No 1 in the Perth marketplace. In August 1993, 94.5FM purchased PMFM (now 92.9) from Kerry Packer, and Roberts was appointed managing director of both stations. Under his guidance, 92.9 and MIX 94.5 dominated the Perth radio market being the No 1 and No 2 stations while Roberts was in charge.

In 1997, Austereo purchased 92.9 and MIX 94.5 for $100,000,000 and Roberts remained as managing director. Roberts was a director of the peak radio industry body for eight years, including three years as chairman of Commercial Radio Australia. This is the industry association for commercial radio representing the interests of 235 member stations nationally, including the major networks of Southern Cross Austereo, Australian Radio Network, Nova Entertainment, Fairfax and Macquarie.

In 2002, Roberts resigned as managing director of Austereo Perth and after a brief holiday in Italy, accepted the role of managing director of Perth's first new commercial FM radio station in 22 years, Nova 93.7.

Nova 93.7 was launched on 5 December 2002 and in its first survey in 2003, was No 1 with its core demographics. Today, Nova 93.7 is Number 1 overall and has more listeners than any other Perth radio station in history with a record of over 600,000 each week and is No 1 Under 40, Under 50 and Under 60. In April 2018, it was announced that Roberts had resigned from that role effective from the beginning of July 2018.#

The launch of the Nova Network across Australia was one of the most successful brands launched in Australian radio history. Roberts in now CEO of Digital Investments Pty Ltd and returned to 96FM as managing director in 2019. Under his direction in 2020 the station has had its best ratings year since it was purchased 7 years ago by ARN. Gary left 96FM in December 2021 and the station is currently Number 1 in Perth with the team he put together.

In the 2020 Australia Day Honor's, Roberts was appointed Member of the Order of Australia for "significant service to broadcast media, particularly to radio".

References

Living people
1952 births
People from Perth, Western Australia
Australian radio personalities
Members of the Order of Australia